Franziska Mascheck (born 4 February 1979 in Dresden) is a German dancer, social worker and politician for the SPD and since 2021 member of the German Bundestag, the federal diet.

Life

Mascheck was born 1979 in the East German city of Dresden and grew up with her two siblings in Schwedt/Oder. She is of Protestant denomination. She is a granddaughter of the aerodynamics scientists Hans-Joachim Mascheck and a descendent of the founders of the dye works Oskar Mascheck, known in Saxony. She became member of the Bundestag in 2021.

She completed a four-year ballet degree at the Palucca University of Dance Dresden. Following that she worked as a dancer in New York and Austin.

After returning to Germany, Mascheck founded the children's and youth dance theater tanzbasis in Berlin. She studied social work and holds a bachelor's degree in it from the Catholic University of Social Sciences in Berlin and is also a trained Montessori teacher.

In 2016, she moved with her husband, the mime artist Marc Mascheck, and their four children to Linda, where they bought a four-sided farm and founded KulturGut Linda e.V..

Politics
Mascheck has held a seat on the local council in Kohren-Sahlis and the Frohburg city council since 2019. She is involved in the town twinning of Kohren-Sahlis with Montottone, Italy.

In 2021, Mascheck was elected deputy district chair of the SPD in the Leipzig district together with Carlo Hohnstedter. Most recently, she has worked freelance for the Children and Youth Foundation of Saxony. She also completed a master’s degree in social work at the Mittweida University of Applied Sciences from 2018 to 2021.

In the 2021 federal election, Mascheck ran in the federal electoral district Leipzig-Land (154) and received 20% of the first votes as the third-place finisher. She entered the 20th German Bundestag via 8th place on the state list of the SPD Saxony. She has been a member of the Bundestag since 2021 and is a full member of the Committee for Housing, Urban Development, Construction and Municipalities.

References

External links

Website of Franziska Mascheck  
Biography at the German Bundestag 
Franziska Mascheck on abgeordnetenwatch.de

Living people
1979 births
Social Democratic Party of Germany politicians
21st-century German politicians
Members of the Bundestag 2021–2025
Members of the Bundestag for Saxony
21st-century German women politicians
Female members of the Bundestag